Jaideva Singh (19 September 1893  in Shoratgarh, Uttar Pradesh – 27 May 1986 in Banaras) was an Indian musicologist and philosopher. He played a key role in the development of All India Radio where he was chief producer. He was influenced by the Indian musicologist Vishnu Narayan Bhatkhande.

Singh was a scholar in the Kashmir Saivism school of Indian philosophy, a subject he studied for many years with Swami Lakshman Joo in Kashmir. He prepared and published first-ever English and Hindi translations of a number of Shaivite scriptures. Singh was appointed as the Chairman of the Uttar Pradesh Sangeet Natak Akademi in 1973.  He was awarded the Padma Bhushan in 1974 for his contribution to music.

Selected works
Introduction to Madhyamaka Philosophy, Bharatiya Vidya Prakashan, Varanasi, 1968.
Pratyabhijnahrdayam: The Secret of Self-Recognition, by Kṣemarāja, translation, Motilal Banarsidass, Delhi, 1977.
Vijnanabhairava or Divine Consciousness: A Treasury of 112 Types of Yoga, translation, Motilal Banarsidass, Delhi, 1979.
Siva Sutras: The Yoga of Supreme Identity, by Vasugupta, translation, Motilal Banarsidass, Delhi, 1979.
Spanda-Karikas: The Divine Creative Pulsation, by Vasugupta, translation, Motilal Banarsidass, Delhi, 1980.
Para-trisika-Vivarana by Abhinavagupta: The Secret of Tantric Mysticism, by Abhinavagupta, translation, Motilal Banarsidass, Delhi, 1988.
Los Shiva Sutras: El yoga del reconocimiento de la identidad con el Ser supremo, by Vasugupta, translation into Spanish, Fundación Genesian, Sevilla, 2000.
Pratyabhijñahridayam. El secreto del autorreconocimiento, by Kṣemarāja, translation into Spanish, Ediciones Maha Yoga, Buenos Aires, 2013.

Notes

References

External links
 In memoriam, The Hindu, 13 May 2011, Gautam Chatterjee

Indian musicologists
20th-century Indian philosophers
1893 births
1986 deaths
Hindustani musicians
All India Radio people
Recipients of the Padma Bhushan in science & engineering
20th-century musicologists
Recipients of the Sangeet Natak Akademi Fellowship